The Arkansas Division of Aeronautics (ADA) is a government division within the Arkansas Department of Commerce in the U.S. state of Arkansas. Its mission is to provide a safer, more desirable atmosphere for the pilot, and at the same time, create and improve airports to better serve Arkansas communities and industry. 

Formerly a separate department of the state government, Asa Hutchinson and the Arkansas General Assembly reorganized state government, effective July 24, 2019. The reorganization created cabinet-level departments, and subordinated several former departments into divisions, including the Arkansas Department of Aeronautics.

See also

U.S. Department of Transportation
List of airports in Arkansas

References

External links
Official website

Aeronautics, Arkansas Department of
State departments of transportation of the United States
Aeronautics, Arkansas Department of
Government agencies established in 1941
Aeronautics, Arkansas Department of